SCBA refers to:-

Types of breathing apparatus:
Self contained breathing apparatus, but usually not for sets used underwater.
Two types of naval diving rebreather which Siebe Gorman in England used to make:-
Swimmer Canoeist's Breathing Apparatus: a type of combat frogman's rebreather.
Submerged Chamber Breathing Apparatus: formerly used to keep the air breathable in submerged chambers.

Other:

 Supreme Court Bar Association (India)                                                                                                                                                                                                                                                                                                                                                                                                                              
 Supreme Court Bar Association (Nepal) 
 Southern California Baseball Association
 ICAO airport code for Balmaceda Airport in Balmaceda, Chile

Rebreathers